Hyala vitrea is a species of minute sea snail, a marine gastropod mollusk or micromollusk in the family Iravadiidae.

Previously, Hyala vitrea was considered as a species of Onoba (Rissoidae).

Description

Distribution
It is found in European waters, in the Mediterranean Sea and in the Black Sea.

Ecology
This species is a grazer and deposit feeder.

References
This article include CC-BY-SA-3.0 text from the reference 

 Ponder W. F. (1984) A review of the genera of the Iravadiidae (Gastropoda: Rissoacea) with an assessment of the relationships of the family. Malacologia 25(1): 21-71
 Gofas, S.; Le Renard, J.; Bouchet, P. (2001). Mollusca, in: Costello, M.J. et al. (Ed.) (2001). European register of marine species: a check-list of the marine species in Europe and a bibliography of guides to their identification. Collection Patrimoines Naturels, 50: pp. 180–213
 de Kluijver, M.J.; Ingalsuo, S.S.; de Bruyne, R.H. (2000). Macrobenthos of the North Sea [CD-ROM]: 1. Keys to Mollusca and Brachiopoda. World Biodiversity Database CD-ROM Series. Expert Center for Taxonomic Identification (ETI): Amsterdam, The Netherlands. . 1 cd-rom pp.

External links
 

Iravadiidae
Gastropods described in 1803